"Sticks and Stones" is an English-language children's rhyme. The rhyme is used as a defense against name-calling and verbal bullying, intended to increase resiliency, avoid physical retaliation and to remain calm and good-living. The full rhyme is usually a variant of:
Sticks and stones may break my bones
But words shall never hurt me.

The first three words of the rhyme are an example of an irreversible binomial.

Earliest appearances 
Alexander William Kinglake in his Eothen (written 1830, published in London, John Ollivier, 1844) used "golden sticks and stones".

It is reported to have appeared in The Christian Recorder of March 1862, a publication of the African Methodist Episcopal Church, where it is presented as an "old adage" in this form:
Sticks and stones may break my bones, but words will never break me.

The phrase also appeared in 1872, where it is presented as advice in Tappy's Chicks: and Other Links Between Nature and Human Nature, by Mrs. George Cupples. The version used in that work runs:
Sticks and stones may break my bones
But names will never harm me.

In popular music

"Sticks and Stones" has been used as the title for many albums and songs, and the rhyme's lyrics have also appeared in many songs, either in its usual form or with altered lyrics.

A version was featured in the Who's 1981 song, "The Quiet One", in which the vocals were performed by bassist John Entwistle, where he mentioned this term from another source he picked up and sang this term twice where he changed "your" from the first set to "my" in the second set.
Sticks and stones may break my bones
But names will never down you

Another version was featured in the Divine Comedy's 2004 song "Sticks and Stones" from the album Absent Friends, in which the vocals were performed by Neil Hannon. 

Sticks and stones may break my body
But words can tear me apart

A version was featured in American rapper and singer Juice WRLD's song "Hurt Me" from the album Goodbye & Good Riddance.

Sticks and stones may break my bones
But the drugs won't hurt me

A version was featured in American singer-songwriter Madonna's song "Like It or Not" from the album Confessions on a Dance Floor.

Sticks and stones may break my bones
But your names will never hurt

A version was featured in  Pete Doherty's rock band Babyshambles's song "Sticks and Stones" from the album Down in Albion.

Sticks and stones may break my bones
Oh but your words they really hurt me

A version was featured in the Pierces's song "Sticks and Stones" from their 2007 album Thirteen Tales of Love and Revenge.

Sticks and stones will break your bones
And leave you lying in the mud
But you get scared when we're alone
Like I might suck your blood

Other songs which have used or interpolated the rhyme include "Titanium" by David Guetta, "S&M" by Rihanna, "Fireball" by Pitbull, "Part of Me" by Katy Perry, "You Need to Calm Down" by Taylor Swift and "What About Us" by Pink.

Trivia
 Sirach 28:17 apparently makes a diametrically opposite statement: "The blow of a whip raises a welt, but a blow of the tongue crushes the bones." (RSV)

References

English children's songs
English folk songs
Songs about bullying